Nebi Mustafi (Macedonian: Неби Мустафи), born 21 August 1976, in Shemsovë, Tetovo, is an Albanian-Macedonian retired footballer who last played in midfield for FK Shkëndija 79. He has also played for the Republic of Macedonia national football team.

Clubs
 1996–1998 : KF Shkëndija
 1998–2004 : FK Sloga Jugomagnat
 2004–2005 : Levadiakos
 2005–2006 : Neuchâtel Xamax
 2006–2007 : Haka
 2007–2010 : MyPa
 2010–2012 : KF Shkëndija
 2012–2013 : FK Drita
 2013-   : KF Shkëndija

International career
He made his senior debut for Macedonia in an August 2001 friendly match against Bulgaria and has earned a total of 7 caps, scoring no goals. His final international was a September 2005 FIFA World Cup qualification match away against Finland.

Personal life
His brother Nuri Mustafi is currently also playing for FK Shkëndija.

Honours
Macedonian Prva Liga: 1998–99, 1999–00, 2000–01, 2010–11
Macedonian Cup: 2000, 2004
Macedonian Super Cup: 2011

References

External links
 
Guardian Football

1976 births
Living people
Sportspeople from Tetovo
Albanian footballers from North Macedonia
Association football midfielders
Macedonian footballers
North Macedonia international footballers
KF Shkëndija players
FK Sloga Jugomagnat players
Levadiakos F.C. players
Neuchâtel Xamax FCS players
FC Haka players
Myllykosken Pallo −47 players
FK Drita players
Macedonian First Football League players
Football League (Greece) players
Swiss Super League players
Veikkausliiga players
Macedonian expatriate footballers
Expatriate footballers in Greece
Macedonian expatriate sportspeople in Greece
Expatriate footballers in Switzerland
Macedonian expatriate sportspeople in Switzerland
Expatriate footballers in Finland
Macedonian expatriate sportspeople in Finland